Gelendzhik is a resort town in Krasnodar Krai, Russia, located on the Gelendzhik Bay of the Black Sea, between Novorossiysk ( to the northwest) and Tuapse ( to the southeast). Population:

History
In antiquity, the Gelendzhik Bay was the site of a minor Greek outpost, mentioned as Torikos in the Periplus of Pseudo-Scylax. It is unknown to Hellenistic sources, but reappears in Roman ones under the name of Pagrae in 64 BC. The colony was wiped out by the invading Huns, which were succeeded by the Zygii soon after. During the Late Middle Ages, the Genoese Republic had a notable influence on the region, while the Ghisolfi, a Genoese-Jewish family, had a prominent role in the trade and commerce in Gazaria. During this period the town was named Maurolaca or Mauro Laco, and was considered one of the most important Genoese colonies in the Black Sea.

Before Russia secured the coast by the Treaty of Adrianople (1829), a brisk slave trade had been carried on between the mountaineers and the Ottoman Empire. Since the Circassian beauties were usually traded for gold and other commodities before being taken to Turkish seraglios, the market place became known as "Gelendzhik" (from "gelincik"), literally, "little bride" in Turkish Language. In 1831, one of the first forts of the Black Sea Coastal Line was set up at Gelendzhik. At the outbreak of the Crimean War the fort had to be blown up and abandoned, but it was resettled by the Cossacks in 1864, at the conclusion of the Russian-Circassian War, and became known as the stanitsa of Gelendzhiksaya. Town status was granted to Gelendzhik in 1915.

Description

During the Soviet period, Gelendzhik was developed as a resort town. It possesses sand beaches, three waterparks, two chairlift lines, and two Orthodox churches (from 1909 and 1913, respectively). The coastal village of Arkhipo-Osipovka, administrated from Gelendzhik, contains the terminus of the Blue Stream gas pipeline. An annual hydroaviasalon is held in Gelendzhik since 1996.

Revealed on 29 March 2001 between Bietingen and Schaffhausen, Litolmore Trading Limited, a company which conducts business in mineral fertilizers, coal, oil, gas, fuel oil, aviation and diesel fuel, is a Gelendzhik firm.

A 17,691 square meters palace allegedly built for Vladimir Putin is located on the Gelendzhik Bay not far from the city.

Administrative and municipal status

Within the framework of administrative divisions, it is, together with twenty rural localities, incorporated as the Town of Gelendzhik—an administrative unit with the status equal to that of the districts. As a municipal division, the Town of Gelendzhik is incorporated as Gelendzhik Urban Okrug.

Climate
Gelendzhik has a borderline humid subtropical climate (Köppen climate classification: Cfa) and a Mediterranean climate (Köppen climate classification: Csa). The climate of Gelendzhik is noticeably drier than Novorossiysk  and Tuapse. Winters are mild and snowfall is light. Summers are hot with warm evenings. Sometimes Gelendzhik has experienced big floods as it happened in 2012 (2012 Krasnodar Krai floods).

Transportation
Gelendzhik is served by the Gelendzhik Airport. A new terminal of Gelendzhik Airport was built in December 2021.

Twin towns – sister cities

Gelendzhik is twinned with:

 Cramlington, United Kingdom
 Ayia Napa, Cyprus
 Angoulême, France
 Hildesheim, Germany
 Kallithea, Greece
 Netanya, Israel
 Vitebsk, Belarus

References

Notes

Sources

External links

 
Gelendzhik Business Directory jsprav.ru 

Cities and towns in Krasnodar Krai
Black Sea Governorate
Seaside resorts in Russia
Territories of the Republic of Genoa
1831 establishments in the Russian Empire